A Celurit or Clurit is generally a sickle (sometimes other variants include billhook) with a pronounced crescent-blade patterns which curves more than half a circle and a long handle, is widely used for agricultural purposes and also in Pencak Silat. When compared to the Arit, the Celurit is slightly larger.

Use 
Although the Celurit (or also generally known as Sabit) is widely used throughout the Indonesian archipelago for agricultural purposes, somehow it is strongly associated with the culture of the Madurese and is frequently used by them as well especially by the leaders who called themselves Sakera. It is possibly used as an agricultural tool in the Banjuwangi region on East Java and then conveyed to Madura.

Besides Arit and Sabit, other variations of the Celurit includes the Arek, Caluk, Calok, Bendo Arit (billhook), Bhiris and so on depending on the geographical area and curvature of the crescent blade.

Culture
Celurit is also a traditional weapon of the Madurese commonly used in Carok (meaning duel in Madurese language, 'fight in the name of honor'), a style of dueling unlike of those dueling style practiced in their neighbouring island in Sulawesi. This weapon is also considered as a legendary weapon often associated with the heroic (pre-independence) freedom fighter, Sakera. The Madurese community are known to attach khodam, a type of mythical creature to abide in the Celurit by a way of prayer before engaging in a carok. The most famous incident in recent years, a mass carok occurred on 13 July 2006 in Bujur Tengah village, Pamekasan Regency, East Java, Indonesia, resulting stabbing and killing of seven men and seriously injuring nine people.

See also

 Kama
 Khopesh
 Kusarigama
 Panabas
 Shotel
 Sickle
 Clurit-class fast attack craft

References 

Blade weapons
Weapons of Indonesia

id:Arit